The 1969–70 Nationalliga A season was the 32nd season of the Nationalliga A, the top level of ice hockey in Switzerland. Eight teams participated in the league, and HC La Chaux-de-Fonds won the championship.

First round

Final round

Relegation

External links
 Championnat de Suisse 1969/70

Swiss
National League (ice hockey) seasons
1969–70 in Swiss ice hockey